The 2007 Exeter City Council election took place on 3 May 2007, to elect members of Exeter City Council in Devon, England. The election was held concurrently with other local elections in England. One third of the council was up for election and the council remained under no overall control.

Results summary

Ward results

Alphington

Cowick

Duryard

Exwick

Heavitree

Mincinglake

Priory

St James

St Leonards

St Loyes

St Thomas

Topsham

Whipton & Barton

References

2007 English local elections
2007
2000s in Exeter